This Is the Life is an American Christian television dramatic series. This anthology series aired in syndication from 1952 to 1988. The series was originally produced by the Lutheran Church–Missouri Synod, and distributed by the International Lutheran Laymen's League.

Format
This Is the Life used two formats for its 36-year run. However, the main core of the series remained the same: presenting everyday and contemporary problems, and resolving them using a Christian solution. Even during the 1950s, topics often were controversial: censorship, morality, bigotry and racism, infidelity, juvenile delinquency, war (including the Vietnam War), and drug abuse. Some stories were light comedy, although most were serious.

1952-1956: The Fisher Family
The series began under the title The Fisher Family, and premiered on the DuMont Television Network in September 1952, and aired on both DuMont and ABC until the fall of 1953. The show entered syndication shortly after its network run ended.

The show's stories revolved around the Fishers, a typical family from Middleburg in an unnamed state of the Midwestern United States. The family included Carl, the father, who was a pharmacist; Anna, the mother (though they were referred to only as Mr. and Mrs. Fisher); their children Emily (18), Pete (16), and Freddie (10); and Grandpa Fisher (presumably Mr. Fisher's widower father), who lived with them. A recurring character was Pastor Martin, who presided over the Lutheran church where the Fishers were members.

Each episode presented a difficult life issue for one or more of the Fishers (or sometimes, the people they encountered); the issue's resolution was found through their Christian faith. Pastor Martin would facilitate this resolving process when the family (or other central character for that particular episode) was unable to do so among themselves. Christian faith as the basis of a strong, functional family was the theme tying the episodes together.

The show came to an end in the spring of 1956 and evolved into the spinoff series titled This Is the Life.

1956-1988: This Is the Life

Replacing The Fisher Family in the fall of 1956, This Is the Life spun off from the former by means of Pastor Martin, who now became the only regular character on the show. The Fishers no longer appeared, but rather a variety of parishioners and other residents of or visitors to Middleburg. The series thus became, in terms of principal characters, an anthology; Christian practice and faith as the means of resolving each episodes principal(s) remained the underlying theme of the series, but by expanding the focus to different characters, a range of problems apart from just those facing a single, Christian nuclear family could be explored, e.g.:

 A businessman must help his drug-addicted sister, but only after he faces his own drug habit.
 A young girl runs away after learning her family is moving to another town because her father accepted a job transfer.
 A college student struggles with grief after losing his girlfriend in a car accident.
 An ex-con trying to reintegrate into the work force sees a question on his job application he has difficulty being honest about.

The characters were not necessarily Lutheran, devout Christians, or even Christians at all. They would ultimately be able to face their difficulties, however, by either turning or returning to Christianity, here in the form of Pastor Martin. Generally, the episode was introduced by Pastor Martin, telling the story of a past event to illustrate a point of doctrine. Generally, he thereafter did not appear in the episode until the crisis came to a head, usually as a consultant turned to by each episode's characters when they had exhausted their own and other "secular" resources.

When Nelson Leigh, who had played that role from The Fisher Family days, retired, other Lutheran ministers replaced him and the minister's role as "host" of the program was dropped. The show continued until 1988, though generally broadcast in its last years mostly on local or cable Christian networks, and videotaped rather than filmed. The move away from a single, central character, even if only briefly seen, along with the rise in televangelism bringing competing shows to the air, and individual religious networks where the lectures of individual personalities were promoted instead of the broad lessons via a teleplay for all of the past, may have contributed to the series' loss of audience.

At some point in its later years, some of the episodes were repackaged and reissued with a different title, Patterns For Living. At times, the editing for doing so was somewhat sloppy, such that the This Is the Life title was still evident.

The series appears to be "lost" now, or at least suppressed by the current rights' holder(s); beyond runs on some public access stations which continue to run tapes of the series received in the past, no re-syndication of any of its seasons or episodes in the past two decades is known, and it has never been available on home video.

Legacy
The success of This Is the Life resulted in several other Christian denominations producing their own religious anthology series. The most successful of these entries was Insight, which was produced by the Roman Catholic-affiliated Paulist Productions, premiering in syndication in 1960 and running for nearly 25 years.

Among less-successful anthologies were:

 This Is the Answer (1958-1961), underwritten by the Southern Baptist Convention.
 The Pastor (1955), the Methodists' entry into the market.

Notable guest stars
Actors appearing in the series included:

Julie Adams
Judith Barsi
Danielle Brisebois
Paul Carr
Kim Darby
Joan Darling
Henry Darrow
Burr DeBenning
Dean Devlin
Angie Dickinson
Conchata Ferrell
Jonathan Frakes
Peggy Ann Garner
Kathy Garver
Bonita Granville
Clu Gulager
Dean Jagger
Nelson Leigh
Kay Lenz
Dave Madden
Ed Nelson
Jack Nicholson
Leonard Nimoy
Lisa Pelikan
Nehemiah Persoff
Brock Peters
Mala Powers
Annette O'Toole
William Schallert
David Ogden Stiers
Lyle Talbot
Glynn Turman
Adam West
Ian Wolfe
Lynn Whitfield
Alan Young

Awards

1972: Nominated for a Primetime Emmy Award for Outstanding Achievement in Religious Programming - Programs.

1980: Won two Daytime Emmy Awards and was nominated for a third.

1983, 1984, 1985: Won the New York International Film and TV Festival Gold Medal Award for episodes, Bon Voyage and Shalom, Reprise for the Lord, and The Face of Gabriel Ortiz, all directed by Sharron Miller.

Bibliography
David Weinstein, The Forgotten Network: DuMont and the Birth of American Television (Philadelphia: Temple University Press, 2004) 
Alex McNeil, Total Television, Fourth edition (New York: Penguin Books, 1980) 
Tim Brooks and Earle Marsh, The Complete Directory to Prime Time Network TV Shows, Third edition (New York: Ballantine Books, 1964) 
 Hal Erickson, Syndicated Television: The First Forty Years, 1947-1987 (Jefferson, NC: McFarland & Co. Inc., 1989)

See also
 List of programs broadcast by the DuMont Television Network
 List of surviving DuMont Television Network broadcasts

References

External links

This Is The Life / The Fisher Family / Patterns For Living
DuMont historical website
September 9, 1952 episode on YouTube
Episodes of the series at Main Street Living!

1952 American television series debuts
1988 American television series endings
1950s American anthology television series
1960s American anthology television series
1970s American anthology television series
1980s American anthology television series
American Broadcasting Company original programming
DuMont Television Network original programming
Black-and-white American television shows
Christian entertainment television series
English-language television shows
Lutheran Church–Missouri Synod
Year of television series ending missing
Television shows set in the Midwestern United States